Ectoedemia arcuatella is a moth of the family Nepticulidae. It is found in most of Europe, except the Iberian Peninsula, east to and the Volga and Ural regions of Russia.

The wingspan is about 5 mm.Head ochreous-yellowish to fuscous. Antennal eyecaps white. Forewings blackish ; an oblique somewhat curved shining silvery fascia in middle ; outer half of cilia beyond a blackish line grey whitish. Hindwings grey. Adults are on wing from June to July.

The larvae feed on Fragaria moschata, Fragaria vesca, Fragaria viridis, Potentilla erecta and Potentilla sterilis. They mine the leaves of their host plant. The mine consists of a narrow, strongly contorted gallery with grey brown frass. The gallery ends in an elongate blotch or broad corridor that frequently overlaps a part of the earlier mine. Pupation takes place outside of the mine.

References

External links
bladmineerders.nl
Ectoedemia arcuatella images at  Consortium for the Barcode of Life
Nepticulidae from the Volga and Ural region
Swedish moths

Nepticulidae
Moths of Europe
Moths described in 1855